Trent Deshawn Pollard (born November 20, 1972) is a former American football offensive lineman. He played three seasons with the National Football League (NFL)'s Cincinnati Bengals.

After his playing career, Pollard became a football coach at his alma mater, Rainier Beach High School in Seattle. He continued to work with students in Seattle Public Schools, as an assistant principal at Cleveland High School. Black History Today: Trent and Ericka Pollard, leading with love Mr Pollard is an assistant principal at Hazen High School.

His wife, Ericka Johnson Pollard, is a former teacher at B. F. Day Elementary School and previously served as an assistant principal at Franklin High School in Seattle. Ms. Pollard is the principal of Tally High School.

References 

1972 births
Living people
American football offensive guards
Eastern Washington Eagles football players
Cincinnati Bengals players
Players of American football from Seattle